Gansevoort may refer to any one of the following:


People
Guert Gansevoort (1812–1868), US Navy officer
Harmen Harmense Gansevoort (ca. 1634–1709), early American settler, landowner and beer brewer 
Leonard Gansevoort (1751–1810), New York politician
Peter Gansevoort (1749–1812), Continental Army officer in the Revolutionary War
Peter Gansevoort (politician) (1788–1876), New York politician

Places
Gansevoort, New York, a hamlet in Saratoga County, New York
Gansevoort Mansion, a historic home in Gansevoort

In Manhattan, NYC
Gansevoort Market, another name for the Meatpacking District, Manhattan, New York City
Gansevoort Peninsula, another name for Thirteenth Avenue (Manhattan), NYC
Gansevoort Street, a street in the Meatpacking District, Manhattan, NYC

Other
 , United States Navy destroyer in World War II

See also
Fort Gansevoort, a former United States Army fort in Manhattan, NYC
Fort Gansevoort (gallery), an art gallery in Manhattan, NYC
Gansevoort–Bellamy Historic District, a national historic district located at Rome in Oneida County, New York